Stephan Leonard Drăghici (born 30 January 1998) is a Romanian professional footballer who plays as a midfielder for CSA Steaua București.

References

External links

 
 
 Stephan Drăghici at LPF.ro 

1998 births
Living people
People from Roșiorii de Vede
Romanian footballers
Association football midfielders
Romania youth international footballers
Liga I players
Liga II players
CS Universitatea Craiova players
SCM Râmnicu Vâlcea players
LPS HD Clinceni players
ASC Daco-Getica București players
Sepsi OSK Sfântu Gheorghe players
CS Gaz Metan Mediaș players
FC Argeș Pitești players
CSA Steaua București footballers